Horrible Histories: Ruthless Romans can refer to:
 A 2003 Horrible Histories book
 Horrible Histories: Ruthless Romans (video game), a 2009 video game
 Horrible Histories: Ruthless Romans (stage show), a 2013 stage show